Gemerské Dechtáre is a village and municipality in the Rimavská Sobota District of the Banská Bystrica Region of southern Slovakia.

History
In historical records, the village was first mentioned in 1246  (1246 Deltar, 1384 Dehcher, 1427 Dether), when it belonged to Ratoldoy family. In the 16th century Turks pillaged the village. In consequence of this, epidemics hit its inhabitants. From 1938 to 1945 it belonged to Hungary.

Genealogical resources

The records for genealogical research are available at the state archive "Statny Archiv in Banska Bystrica, Slovakia"

 Roman Catholic church records (births/marriages/deaths): 1761-1896 (parish B)
 Reformated church records (births/marriages/deaths): 1769-1858 (parish B)

See also
 List of municipalities and towns in Slovakia

External links
https://web.archive.org/web/20080111223415/http://www.statistics.sk/mosmis/eng/run.html 
http://www.e-obce.sk/obec/gemerskedechtare/gemerske-dechtare.html
Surnames of living people in Gemerske Dechtare

Villages and municipalities in Rimavská Sobota District